Charles William Alexander Thornely (born 5 October 1958 at Lancaster, Lancashire) is a former cricketer, and a poet and writer. He was educated at Sedbergh School where his father was headmaster. He is the uncle of Leicestershire and former Sussex cricketer Michael Thornely. He taught for many years in England at both primary and secondary level before teaching English abroad in Portugal, Poland and Italy.

He played cricket for Cambridgeshire at minor county level from 1986 to 1988 as a batsman, making one List A appearance against Warwickshire. Batting from the lower order he scored 11 not out.

He has published a volume of poems titled Searching for the Enemy.

External links
Charles Thornely at Cricket Archive 
 Publications

1958 births
Living people
English cricketers
Cambridgeshire cricketers